Kye Jin-gyo is a North Korean former footballer. He represented North Korea on at least four occasions between 1980 and 1981.

Career statistics

International

References

Date of birth unknown
Living people
North Korean footballers
North Korea international footballers
Association football midfielders
Year of birth missing (living people)